Naja Bahrenscheer (born 3 September 1996) is a Danish footballer who plays as a goalkeeper for Brøndby IF in the Elitedivisionen and has appeared for the Denmark women's national team. She has also played for the Danish youth teams several times.

Club career
She started playing for Ballerup-Skovlunde Fodbold in her youth years. In 2018, she moved up to the first team, but she signed with LB07 Malmö in some months after. She went back to Ballerup-Skovlunde Fodbold in Spring 2019. After been first choice-goalkeeper in the club, she moved to the rivals from Brøndby IF.

References

External links
 
 
 Denmark player profile

1996 births
Living people
Danish women's footballers
Place of birth missing (living people)
Women's association football forwards
People from Helsingør
Ballerup-Skovlunde Fodbold (women) players
Brøndby IF (women) players
Sportspeople from the Capital Region of Denmark
Denmark women's international footballers